Solid Rock may refer to:

Organizations
 Solid Rock Foundation, a Christian nonprofit organization
 Solid Rock Lutherans, a movement within the Evangelical Lutheran Church in America

Albums
 Solid Rock (The Temptations album)
 Solid Rock (The Rolling Stones album)

Songs
 "Solid Rock" (hymn)
 "Solid Rock" (Desperation Band song)
 "Solid Rock" (Dire Straits song)
 "Solid Rock" (Goanna song)
 "Solid Rock", by Delirious? on the album Now Is the Time – Live at Willow Creek 
 "Solid Rock", by Bob Dylan on the album Saved

Other uses
 Solid Rock Records, the record label of Larry Norman